Emam Abbas-e Olya (also Romanized as Emām ʿAbbās-e ‘Olyā) is a village in Jeygaran Rural District, Ozgoleh District, Salas-e Babajani County, Kermanshah Province, Iran. At the 2006 census, its population was 155, in 29 families.

References 

Populated places in Salas-e Babajani County